The national flag of Ukraine consists of equally sized horizontal bands of blue and yellow.

The blue and yellow bicolour first appeared during the 1848 Spring of Nations in Lemberg, then part of the Austrian Empire. It was adopted as a state flag for the first time in the aftermath of the Russian Revolution by the Ukrainian People's Republic, the West Ukrainian People's Republic and the Ukrainian State. It was also later adopted by Carpatho-Ukraine in March 1939. When Ukraine was part of the Soviet Union, the bicolour was banned and it used flag of the Ukrainian Soviet Socialist Republic which featured a red flag along with the azure bottom with a golden hammer and sickle and a golden bordered red star on top. During the dissolution of the Soviet Union, the bicolour gradually returned in use before officially being adopted again on 28 January 1992 by the Ukrainian parliament.

Ukraine has celebrated the Day of the National Flag on 23 August since 2004.

Lo:ທຸງຊາດອູແກຣນ

Design
Ukrainian law states that the colours of Ukrainian flag are "blue and yellow", but other state bodies have determined the colours. In the table below, the colours are presented according to DSTU 4512:2006 technical specifications:

There has been disagreement over the shade of blue used in the flag. In 2013, scholar Dmytro Malakov argued that sky blue was the correct colour, and that, according to rules of heraldry, dark blue should not be used. The Ukrainian Heraldry Society stated that this heraldry issue does not apply to flags.

The flag is similar to that of the Austrian state of Lower Austria, the German city of Chemnitz, historical Kingdom of Dalmatia (now Croatia) and the Hungarian city of Pécs, but all of those flags have a darker shade of blue. The flag is also somewhat similar to that of the Malaysian state of Perlis, but has a reversed colour arrangement, darker shades of blue and yellow, and a different aspect ratio.

Protocol and use

Article 20 of the Constitution of Ukraine states that "the State Flag of Ukraine is a banner of two equally sized horizontal bands of blue and yellow colour.".

In addition to the normal horizontal format, many public buildings, such as the Verkhovna Rada, use vertical flags. Most town halls fly their town flag together with the national flag in this way; some town flags in Ukraine exist only in vertical form. The proportions of these vertical flags are not specified. When hung like a banner or draped, the blue band should be on the left. When flown from a vertical flagpole, the blue band must face the mast.

The flag did not appear on Ukrainian postal stamp issues until 1992, when they depicted the flag with the state coat of arms. Since then, the flag has frequently appeared on stamps. Cinderella stamps of the Organization of Ukrainian Nationalists were printed outside Ukraine during the Soviet period for patriotic purposes.

Decoration
Traditionally, the flag may be decorated with a golden fringe surrounding the perimeter of the flag, as long as it does not deface the flag proper. The tradition began with the flag of the Ukrainian SSR. In addition, the Great Soviet Encyclopedia shows a flag decorated with a gold star. Ceremonial displays of the flag, such as those in parades or on indoor posts, often use a fringe to enhance the allure of the flag. No specific law governs the use of the fringe. Traditionally, the Army, Guard, Navy and Air Force use a fringed flag for parades, colour guards and indoor displays, while the Office of the President and local authorities use a fringed flag on all occasions.

Places of continuous display
Ukrainian flags are customarily displayed continuously in certain locations.
 Maidan Nezalezhnosti, main square of Kyiv, traditional site for political rallies, including large-scale radical protest campaigns (Orange Revolution and Euromaidan)
 Presidential Administration Building, Verkhovna Rada building and Budynok Uryadu
 Kyiv City Council
 Lviv High Castle
 Vernadsky Research Base
 State Border Guard Service of Ukraine sites
 National, regional and local government buildings
 Ukrainian embassies and consulates

Particular days for display
In particular, the flag should be displayed at full staff on the following days:
 1 January: New Year's Day
 7 January: Christmas (Julian)
 22 January: Ukrainian Unity and Freedom Day
 8 March: International Women's Day
 1 & 2 May: International Workers' Day
 9 May: Victory Day over Nazism
 28 June: Constitution Day
 23 August: Flag Day
 24 August: Independence Day
 13 October: Defenders of Ukraine Day
 21 November: Day of Dignity and Freedom
 6 December: Armed Forces Day
 25 December: Christmas (Gregorian/Neo-Julian)

Display at half-staff
The flag is displayed at half-staff (or half-mast) as a sign of respect or mourning. When done nationwide, such a step is proclaimed by the president. Half-mast means flying a flag two-thirds of the way up a flagpole; the top of the flag must be at least a flag's height from the top of the flagpole. Black ribbons indicate mourning on banners that can't be lowered to half-mast.
 4th Saturday of November: Holodomor Memorial Day
 Other historical cases: mass victims of accidents, Russo-Ukrainian War and Euromaidan; death and state funeral of Lech and Maria Kaczyński, funeral of Pope John Paul II and 11 September attacks.

Flag Day

The Day of the National Flag in Ukraine is celebrated on 23 August; it began in 2004. Previously, 24 July was National Flag Day in Kyiv. The first ceremonial raising of the yellow-and-blue Ukrainian flag in modern times took place on 24 July 1990, at the flagstaff of the Kyiv City Council, two years before the flag was officially adopted as the National flag. Since 1992, the Independence Day of Ukraine has been celebrated on 24 August. Following a government decree, the flag must be flown from public buildings on this date and certain other holidays; not all are public holidays. Flags must also be flown on parliamentary election days and regional-specific flag days. The public display of flags to mark other events, such as the election of the president or the death of a prominent politician (whereupon flags are flown at half-mast), can be declared at the discretion of the Cabinet of Ministers. When flags are flown at half-mast, vertical flags are not lowered. A black mourning ribbon is instead attached, either atop the mast if hung from a pole, or to each end of the flag's supporting cross-beams if flown like a banner.

History

The roots of Ukrainian national symbols come from pre-Christian times when yellow and blue prevailed in traditional ceremonies, reflecting fire and water. During the battle of Grunwald in 1410 two Polish banners of Lwów and Przemyśl Lands used flags with yellow and blue colours.

Blue-yellow, red-black, crimson-olive and especially raspberry colour banners were widely used by Cossacks between the 16th and 18th centuries. These were not the only possible combinations, since normally Cossacks would fly their hetman's banners, which were similar to the coats of arms of the nobility. Also, yellow and blue were the colours common on coats of arms in Galicia. In fact, the coat of arms of Lviv to this day remains a golden lion on a blue field.

Some put the starting point of the adoption of the current national flag of Ukraine to 1848 when, during the Spring of the Nations on 22 April 1848, a blue-and-yellow banner was adopted by the Supreme Ruthenian Council in Lemberg (Lviv), the capital of the Kingdom of Galicia and Lodomeria, and flew over the city's magistrate for the first time. Although this move did not have significant consequences, the newly formed Ukrainian divisions in the Austrian army used blue-and-yellow banners in their insignia.

During the Russian Revolution of 1905, this flag was used by Ukrainians of the Dnieper Ukraine.

Early independence: 1917–1921

Both blue-yellow and yellow-blue flags were widely used during the Ukrainian struggle for independence in 1917. For the first time in the history of the Russian Empire, the blue-yellow flag was flown on 25 March 1917 in Petrograd during a 20,000-strong mass demonstration. On the territory of Ukraine the national flag was flown for the first time in Kyiv on 29 March 1917 by soldiers. On 1 April 1917, Kyiv saw a 100,000-strong demonstration where over 320 national flags were flown. Afterwards, similar demonstrations with Ukrainian flags took place across the entire Russian Empire, even beyond ethnic Ukrainian lands. Numerous famous Ukrainian politicians wrote about the 1 April demonstration, including Mykhailo Hrushevsky and Serhiy Yefremov, noting that there were blue-and-yellow flags, while Dmytro Doroshenko claimed that they were yellow and blue. The blue-yellow flag was flown at the First Ukrainian Military Congress on 18 May 1917.

The official flag established by the Ukrainian People's Republic in 1918 was blue-yellow. Instead, they refer to the decision on the Fleet Flag, which was to be light blue–yellow, as an indication that the official flag was light blue–yellow. Also adopted were several other service flags of the Ukrainian People's Republic.

The official flag of Pavlo Skoropadsky's Hetmanate was also light blue-yellow and remained the same under the Directorate of Symon Petlura. The flag of the West Ukrainian People's Republic was blue-yellow. The stateless Makhnovshchina, which existed during the Ukrainian War of Independence, used the black flag.

Among Ukrainian immigrant organisations, there were proponents of both blue-yellow and yellow-blue flags. Eventually, an agreement was reached to use the blue-yellow flag until the issue could be resolved by an independent Ukraine.

Soviet Ukraine: 1922–1991

During Soviet rule, the Ukrainian flag was banned, and anyone displaying it could be criminally prosecuted for "anti-Soviet propaganda". The first flag of the Ukrainian Soviet Socialist Republic was adopted on 10 March 1919, to serve as the symbol of state of Soviet Ukraine. Details of the official flag changed periodically before the break-up of the Soviet Union in 1991, but all were based on the red flag of the October Revolution in Russia and an exact replica of the flags of the neighbouring Russian SFSR.
The first flag was red with the gold Cyrillic sans-serif letters У.С.С.Р. (USSR, acronym for Ukrayinskaya Sotsialisticheskaya Sovetskaya Respublika in the Russian language). In the 1930s, a gold border was added to the flag. In 1937, a new flag was adopted, with a small gold hammer and sickle added above the gold Cyrillic serif У.Р.С.Р. (URSR, for Ukrayins’ka Radyans’ka Sotsialistychna Respublika in the Ukrainian language).

Interbellum and Reichskommissariat Ukraine
The Organisation of Ukrainian Nationalists is a Ukrainian political organisation which as a movement was originally created in 1929 in Western Ukraine (interwar Poland at the time). For a long time, the OUN did not officially have its own flag; however, during the Hungarian and Polish aggression against the Republic of Carpathian Ukraine in 1939, Carpathian Sich, a militarised wing of the OUN, adopted as its flag a design taken from the OUN's emblem – a golden nationalistic trident on a blue background. The flag was finalised and only officially adopted by the organisation in 1964 at the 5th Assembly of Ukrainian Nationalists.

The Ukrainian Insurgent Army was a Ukrainian nationalist paramilitary and later partisan army that engaged in a series of guerrilla conflicts during World War II against Nazi Germany, the Soviet Union, Czechoslovakia, and both underground and communist Poland. The group was the military wing of the Organisation of Ukrainian Nationalists — Bandera faction (the OUN-B), originally formed in Volyn in the spring and summer of 1943. Its official date of creation is 14 October 1942. The battle flag of the UPA was a 2:3 ratio red-and-black banner. The flag continues to be a symbol of the Ukrainian nationalist movement. The colours of the flag symbolise 'Ukrainian red blood spilled on Ukrainian black earth'.

In 1949, the flag of the Soviet Ukraine was changed once again. The Soviet Union managed to obtain two additional seats in the United Nations by adding Ukraine and Byelorussia as member states. The flag change came about because all the Soviet flags were the same. The new Ukrainian flag consisted of red (top, 2/3) and azure (bottom, 1/3) stripes, with the golden star, hammer and sickle in the top left corner. Communist party leaders such as Nikita Khrushchev and Lazar Kaganovich feared using words like 'light blue' and 'blue' in the official flag colors, as they were the terms used by the Ukrainian diaspora.

During the Soviet period, multiple unsanctioned attempts to hoist the national blue-and-yellow flag were made. In 1958, an underground group was established in the village of Verbytsia, Khodoriv Raion; its members raised national flags and spread anti-Soviet pamphlets under cover of darkness.

Return of the national flag

Under the influence of Mikhail Gorbachev's policies of perestroika and glasnost, individual Soviet republics gained a strengthened sense of national identity, leading to the collapse of the Soviet Union in 1991. This was particularly true for the three Baltic states and Western Ukraine, which were the last territories annexed into Soviet Union. The national awakening was accompanied by attempts to restore historical national symbols. In 1988, the Supreme Soviet of the Lithuanian SSR re-established Lithuania's national flag and coat of arms as the state symbol. The parliaments of Latvia and Estonia soon followed suit.

The events in the Baltic countries soon led to similar patterns in Ukraine. In particular, West Ukraine and the Ukrainian SSR's capital city of Kyiv were the scenes of near-constant political demonstrations, in which yellow-and-blue flags were waved by demonstrators.
 On 14 March 1990, the Ukrainian flag was raised for the first time since the establishment of the Soviet Union in the small city of Stryi.
 On 20 March 1990, the Ternopil town council voted on the use and re-establishment of the yellow-and-blue flag and the tryzub and Shche ne vmerla Ukrainy national anthem. The same day, the yellow-and-blue national flag was flown for the first time in 80 years on a governmental building in Kyiv, replacing the then-official red-azure flag of the Ukrainian SSR.
 On 28 April 1990, the Lviv oblast council (oblasna rada) also allowed the use of the national symbols of Ukraine within the Oblast.
 On 29 April 1990, the yellow-and-blue flag was flown from the Ternopil city theatre's flagstaff without the flag of the Soviet Union hanging above it.
 After 24 July 1990, the yellow-and-blue flag was flown for the first time over an official governmental building, the Kyiv City Council, on Maidan Nezalezhnosti Square of Khreschatyk Street.
 After the declaration of independence of Ukraine on 24 August 1991, the national yellow-and-blue flag flew for the first time over the Ukrainian Parliament (Verkhovna Rada) building on 4 September 1991.

The blue and yellow flag was provisionally adopted for official ceremonies in September 1991 following Ukrainian independence, before officially being restored on 28 January 1992 by the Parliament of Ukraine. At the beginning of the 2022 Russian invasion of Ukraine, landmarks all over the world were lit up with the colours of the Ukrainian flag, while numerous cities raised the Ukrainian flag in solidarity.

Controversies and criticism

Origin
One claimed version is that, since one of the first known coloured depictions of the Coat of Arms of Kyiv was mainly in yellow-blue colours, this tradition may have existed since the time of the Nordic-Slavic Grand Prince of Kyiv Volodymyr the Great. However, the blue-yellow colouring dates back to Kievan Rus’, as an early version of the Tryzub, Ukraine's national coat of arms, sported the same colouring as the seal of Sviatoslav I of Kyiv (c. AD 945). During the 1709 Battle of Poltava, the Cossacks following Mazepa fought under yellow-blue banners, while their Swedish allies were under yellow ones. Some Cossacks and noblemen had coats of arms in yellow and blue.

Yellow-blue versus blue-yellow
Ukrainians commonly refer to the flag as "yellow and light blue" (zhovto-blakytnyy)—a different version of the flag used during UNR (Ukrainian National Republic) years (1917–1921) with yellow on the top and blue on the bottom. The yellow on the top allegedly represents golden domes (cupolas) of Christian churches and the blue the Dnieper river.

The head of the Ukrainian Heraldry Society, Andriy Grechylo, points to the fact that the discussion about order of colours was taking place as far back as 1918. Nonetheless, both governments of the Ukrainian People's Republic as well as the Ukrainian State defined that the upper half would be light-blue, while the lower would be yellow. During 1918 it was taken into consideration that light blue would lose its shade under sun, therefore it was decided to make the colour darker.

Already in the 1918 draft of the Constitution of the Ukrainian People's Republic, the order of colours was defined as blue and yellow. The same order could be found in legislative acts of the West Ukrainian People's Republic for November 1918 and the Republic of Carpathian Ukraine on 15 March 1939. The argument on the order of colours was taking place in the Ukrainian diaspora as well. In 1949 it was decided that, until Ukraine defined a single state flag, the diaspora would use the blue-and-yellow banner.

Attempts to revive Soviet flags
On 21 April 2011, the Verkhovna Rada passed a law allowing the Victory Banner to be raised on Victory Day. The current Victory Banner was adopted in Russia in 2007. On 20 May 2011, the law was signed by the President of Ukraine Viktor Yanukovych. On 17 June 2011, the Constitutional Court of Ukraine recognised the law as unconstitutional and proposed that the parliament implement required amendments to the Constitution of Ukraine.

On 9 April 2015, the Ukrainian parliament passed legislation on decommunization, banning the promotion of symbols of "Communist and National Socialist totalitarian regimes". Since then, Soviet symbols, like the Victory Banner, have only been allowed in cemeteries.

Although the Soviet flags remained illegal in Ukraine, they have been flown in territories outside of the government's control after Russia invaded the country in 2022 and occupied parts of it.

Flag of the head of state
Throughout the history of Ukraine, various heads of state have used different flags. The designs differ according to the historical era they were used in and in accordance with the political scene in Ukraine at the time. The first flag to be used by a head of state of Ukraine was that of Pavlo Skoropadskyi. The current design, the flag of the President of Ukraine, was adopted in 1999. In 2022 the President of Ukraine used a variant where the left side of the blue upper-half contains the yellow Tryzub.

Military flags

Historical

Gallery

See also

 List of Ukrainian flags
 Flags of the regions of Ukraine
 Coat of arms of Ukraine
 National colours of Ukraine

References

External links

 
 DSTU 4512:2006 Technical specifications from DSTU (Ukrainian national standards body) regarding flag of Ukraine, in Ukrainian. 1 September 2006.
 Ukraine – Vexillographia
 Armed Forces Flag in Ukraine
 Departmantal Flag and Emblem in Ukraine
 Brief history of the flag  at the Science Library of Franko National University (Lviv).
 "About Ukrainian flag". Statement of the Presidium of the Supreme Council of Ukraine. 18 September 1991.
 "About the State Flag of Ukraine". State of the Supreme Council of Ukraine. 28 January 1992.

 
Ukraine
National symbols of Ukraine
Ukraine
Ukraine
Ukraine
1992 in Ukraine